The Locke–Baldwin–Kinsley House is a historic house at 45 Green Street in Stoneham, Massachusetts.  The two-story timber-frame house was built c. 1744 on land belonging to the Locke family.  It has two slender interior chimneys, and an ell on the south side that has documented use as a shoe shop its early 19th-century owners.  The house was later (1867) owned by Micah Baldwin, a harness maker, and has remained in the hands of his descendants.

The house was listed on the National Register of Historic Places in 1984.

See also
National Register of Historic Places listings in Stoneham, Massachusetts
National Register of Historic Places listings in Middlesex County, Massachusetts

References

Houses on the National Register of Historic Places in Stoneham, Massachusetts
Houses completed in 1744
Houses in Stoneham, Massachusetts
1744 establishments in the Thirteen Colonies